Aitrach is a river of Baden-Württemberg, Germany. It is formed at the confluence of the Wurzacher Ach and the Eschach near Leutkirch im Allgäu. It is a left tributary of the Iller, which it joins near the village Aitrach. Including the Wurzacher Ach, it is 39.6 km long.

See also
List of rivers of Baden-Württemberg

References

Rivers of Baden-Württemberg
Rivers of Germany